Aspidoscelis angusticeps, the Yucatán whiptail, is a species of teiid lizard found in Mexico, Guatemala, and Belize.

Subspecies of Aspidoscelis angusticeps are:

 Aspidoscelis angusticeps petenensis (BEARGIE & MCCOY 1964)

 Aspidoscelis angusticeps angusticeps (COPE 1877)

References

angusticeps
Reptiles described in 1878
Taxa named by Edward Drinker Cope
Reptiles of Mexico